Dalcouth is a locality in the Southern Downs Region, Queensland, Australia. It is on the border with New South Wales.

Geography 
The locality is loosely bounded by the Great Dividing Range to the north-east and east, which forms the border with New South Wales.

Koola is an Aboriginal wod meaning koala.

History 
Ten Mile Rock Provisional School opened on 27 July 1908. On 1 January 1909, it became Ten Mile Rock State School. In 1915, it was renamed Dalcouth State School. It closed in 1964. It was at 182 Gentle Road.

During 2020 and 2021, the Queensland border was closed due to the COVID-19 pandemic. Some border crossing points had Queensland Police checkpoints to confirm eligibility to enter Queensland, while other border crossing points were closed. At Dalcouth, the border crossing on  Amosfield Road to New South Wales was only open to local people with no through traffic permitted.

Education 
There are no schools in Dalcouth. The nearest government primary school is Stanthorpe State School and the nearest government  secondary school is Stanthorpe State High School, both in neighbouring Stanthorpe to the west.

References 

Southern Downs Region
Localities in Queensland